Brighton is a former town and current neighborhood of Boston, Massachusetts, United States, located in the northwestern corner of the city. It is named after the English city of Brighton. Initially Brighton was part of Cambridge, and known as "Little Cambridge". Brighton separated from Cambridge in 1807 after a bridge dispute, and was annexed to Boston in 1874. For much of its early history, it was a rural town with a significant commercial center at its eastern end.

The neighborhood of Allston was also formerly part of the town of Brighton, but is now often considered to be separate, leading to the name Allston–Brighton for the combined area. This historic center of Brighton is the Brighton Center Historic District. The Aberdeen section of Brighton was designated as a local architectural conservation district by the Boston Landmarks Commission in 2001.

History

In 1630, land comprising present-day Allston–Brighton and Newton was assigned to Watertown. In 1634, the Massachusetts Bay Colony transferred ownership of the south side of the Charles River, including present-day Allston–Brighton and Newton, from Watertown to Newtowne, which was soon renamed Cambridge. In 1646, Reverend John Eliot established a "Praying Indian" village on the present Newton–Brighton boundary, where resided local natives converted to Christianity. The first permanent English settlement came as settlers crossed the Charles River from Cambridge, establishing Little Cambridge, the area's name before 1807.

Before the American Revolutionary War, Little Cambridge became a small, prosperous farming community with fewer than 300 residents. Its inhabitants included wealthy Boston merchants such as Benjamin Faneuil (after whom a  street in Brighton is named). A key event in the history of Allston–Brighton was the establishment in 1775 of a cattle market to supply the Continental Army. Jonathan Winship I and Jonathan Winship II established the market, and in the post-war period that followed, the Winships became the largest meat packers in Massachusetts. The residents of Little Cambridge resolved to secede from Cambridge when the latter's government made decisions detrimental to the cattle industry and also failed to repair the Great Bridge linking Little Cambridge with Cambridge proper. Legislative approval for separation was obtained in 1807, and Little Cambridge renamed itself Brighton.

In 1820, the horticulture industry was introduced to the town. Over the next 20 years, Brighton blossomed as one of the most important gardening neighborhoods in the Boston area. Its businessmen did not neglect the cattle industry, however. In 1834, the Boston & Worcester Railroad was built, solidifying the community's hold on the cattle trade. By 1866, the town contained 41 slaughterhouses, which later were consolidated into the Brighton Stock Yards and Brighton Abattoir.

In October 1873, the Town of Brighton in Middlesex County voted to annex itself to the City of Boston in Suffolk County, and in January 1874 Brighton officially became part of the City of Boston. Allston–Brighton's population grew rapidly in the next 50 years, rising from 6,000 in 1875 to 47,000 by 1925.

Transportation
Brighton is accessible via the B branch of the Massachusetts Bay Transportation Authority (MBTA)'s Green Line light rail service, which has 11 stops along Commonwealth Avenue in Brighton. Cleveland Circle on the C branch is located in the southern tip of Brighton, and the D branch is nearby. The former A branch of the Green Line, (discontinued in 1969), also served the community.

Geography

Brighton is connected to the rest of Boston by the Allston neighborhood. It is otherwise surrounded by Cambridge, Watertown, Newton, and Brookline. The Charles River separates Brighton from Cambridge and Watertown.

Brighton is administered jointly with the adjacent neighborhood of Allston (zip code 02134). Brighton is generally to the west of Everett, Gordon and Kelton streets. , the city councilor of Allston-Brighton is Liz Breadon. Breadon's predecessor Mark Ciommo held this position from 2007 to 2019.

Demographics
As of 2020, the estimated population of Brighton is 48,330. The population density is 15,784 per mi2, slightly lower than the citywide average of 16,686 per mi2. The median age is 29.3. The largest measured age cohort is 25–34, which comprises 36.4% of the population (note: depending on methodology, college students might not be counted). 60.7% of the population have never been married.

The population was 65.5% white, 14.9% Asian American, 4.4% black or African American, and nearly 11.1% Hispanic of any race.

65.5% of Brighton residents graduated from a four-year college.

, the median home price was $542,900 compared with $291,700 for the country as a whole, and the cost of living was 30% higher than the national average. Brighton has a comparatively older housing stock. The median home age was 67 years and 39.8% of homes were built before 1939.

The largest religious group (48.2%) is Catholic, with Protestants and other Christians making up the second-largest at 4.9% of the population. The next largest religions are Baptist (2%), Islam 1.1%, and Episcopalian also at 1.1% .

Race and ancestry

According to the 2012-2016 American Community Survey 5-Year Estimates, the largest ancestry groups in ZIP Code 02135 are:

Education

Brighton is home to many Boston Public Schools:
Elementary
Edison School
Winship School
Baldwin Pilot School
Mary Lyon Lower School (K–8)
Secondary
Boston Green Academy
Brighton High School
Mary Lyon Upper Pilot High School (9–12)
Saint Joseph Preparatory High School

Brighton was home to many Catholic schools, many of which have closed: Our Lady of the Presentation in Oak Square (closed 2005), Saint Gabriel's, behind Saint Elizabeth Medical Center (closed 1970), Saint Sebastian's School in the Oak Square Heights (moved to Needham in 1977). Our Lady of Presentation School is currently under study for landmark status by the Boston Landmarks Commission. Remaining are Saint Columbkille's School on Arlington Street (K–8) and St. Joseph's Preparatory Academy (formerly Mount St. Joseph Academy), a co-educational high school located on Cambridge Street. The EF International Language School, an English and college preparatory school for international students, is located on Lake Street. The City of Boston leases the former Hamilton Elementary School building on Chestnut Hill Avenue to Bais Yaakov High School for Girls and Torah Academy of Brookline; Shaloh House Hebrew Day School is several blocks away.

Brighton is home to the Everest Institute, Saint John's Seminary and portions of Boston College. The area is also close to other colleges, including Boston University, and houses many of their students and faculty.

Notable people

Michael Bloomberg, mayor of New York City, born in Brighton, but raised in Medford
Mike Brady, winner of nine PGA events between 1916 and 1926
Fred Cusick, Boston Bruins play-by-play announcer for 45 years
Steve DeOssie, former professional football player for the NFL's New York Giants and New England Patriots
Dave Fay, sports journalist
William F. Galvin, Massachusetts Secretary of State
John Kelleher, was a backup infielder in Major League Baseball, playing mainly for Chicago Cubs.
John F. Kelly, the 5th United States Secretary of Homeland Security
Joseph P. Kennedy II, son of the late Robert F. Kennedy; former U.S. Congressman for Massachusetts's 8th district
Patrick J. Kennedy, son of the late Ted Kennedy; former U.S. Congressman for Rhode Island's 1st district
Chang Sik Kim, South Korean Buddhist master and founder of the art of Shim Gum Do, a Korean sword school
John Krasinski, film actor, director, writer
Dennis Lehane, author of Mystic River and many other Boston-set novels
Mr. Lif, rapper
Theodore B. Lyman, fourth Bishop of the Episcopal Diocese of North Carolina
Mike Milbury, former coach and player of the NHL's Boston Bruins
Amy Poehler, actress writer and comedian, lived on Strathmore Road while in college
Brigadier General Edmund Rice, recipient of the Medal of Honor
Edward E. Rice, New York stage producer.
Fred Salvucci, former Massachusetts Secretary of Transportation
Simon Shnapir, American Olympic medalist pair skater
Charles Richard Stith, former U.S. Ambassador to Tanzania
 Aidan "Eggsy Malone" Thaggard, notorious bank robber and bootlegger during the 1930s
Noah Welch, professional hockey player, 2018 US Olympic Team Member

References

Further reading
 Brighton Board of Trade history page
 Dr. William P. Marchione, "A Short History of Allston-Brighton"
 Dr. William P. Marchione, The Bull in the Garden (1986)
 Dr. William P. Marchione, Images of America: Allston-Brighton (1996)
 Excerpts from "Historical Allston-Brighton"
1871 Atlas of Massachusetts. by Wall & Gray.Map of Massachusetts. Map of Middlesex County.
 History of Middlesex County, Massachusetts, Compiled by Samuel Adams Drake, published 1879, Volume1 page 278 Brighton, by Rev. Frederic Whitney.   Note Brighton was originally part of Middlesex County before joining Boston which is Suffolk County.

External links

 Brighton-Allston Historical Society
 The Oak Square History Page
 Allston Brighton Community Development Corporation

 
Defunct towns in Massachusetts
Former municipalities in Boston
Neighborhoods in Boston
Populated places established in 1807